Al-Ghafūr (ALA-LC romanization of ) is one of the Names of Allah. It means The Ever-Forgiving, The All-Forgiving. It is part of the 99 Names of Allah, by which Muslims regard Allah, and it is described in Qur'ān and Sunnah.

Descriptive meaning of the name 
The one who completely forgives our sins and faults.

The one who veils or forgives our sins and faults such that they are not seen by anyone else, not even the angels

The one who is the perfection of forgiveness. The One whose forgiving demonstrates excellence, completeness and perfection of forgiveness.

A Bukhari Hadith mentions the division of Allah's mercy as:

Narrated Abu Huraira; I heard Allah's Messenger (ﷺ) saying, Allah divided Mercy into one hundred parts. He kept ninety nine parts with Him and sent down one part to the earth, and because of that, its one single part, His Creations are merciful to each other, so that even the mare lifts up its hoofs away from its baby animal, lest it should trample on it."

Linguistic translation of Al-Ghafūr 
The root verb of Al-Ghaffoor and Al-Ghaffaar is  gha-fa-ra (غَفَرَ) which points to three main meanings:

 The first meaning is to cover, veil, conceal, and hide.
 The second meaning is to pardon, to forgive, and to set aright.
 And the third meaning is to cover a thing to protect it (from dirt).

Occurrence in the Qur'an 
Allah’s name Al-Ghafūr occurs 91 times in the Quran, making it one of the most common names mentioned in there. It has come in Qur'an in combination with other Attributes of Allah like:

Ar-Raheem: 72 times Allah mentions Al-Ghafūr with Ar-Raheem, one of the most common sets of pairs of Allah’s names.
Al-Haleem: 6 times Allah pairs Al-Ghafūr with Al-Haleem. Al-Haleem means The Forbearing—the one who is able to restrain his anger after being justifiably angry. He is capable of being angry with us, but he restrains and forgives us.
Al-’Afuww: 4 times Allah pairs Al-Ghaffoor with Al-’Affuw, meaning only He is the one who covers our sins, also wipes them out, and utterly obliterates them with his forgiveness.
Ash-Shakuwr: 3 times He pairs this with As-Shakuwr (الشكور), the one who appreciates what you’ve done and rewards you with more than you deserve. Pairing this with Al-Ghafūr proves that only He is the one who forgives infinite times and blesses his servants infinitely more than they deserve.
Al-Aziz: 2 times Allah pairs Al-Ghafūr with Al-Aziz (العزيز). Al-Aziz means The Almighty, The Honorable.
Al-Waduwd: 1 time Allah pairs Al-Ghafūr with Al-Waduwd (الوَدُود). Al-Waduwd means The Most Loving.

References

Names of God in Islam